Joseph Mason (17 August 1940 – 26 September 2019) was a Scottish professional football player who is best known for his time with Greenock Morton and Rangers.

Playing career
Mason made his professional debut for Kilmarnock after joining from junior side Lugar Boswell Thistle. He made the bulk of his league appearances when he moved to Morton in May 1966. Mason joined Rangers in October 1972.

Coaching career
Mason retired from playing and joined the Rangers coach staff under Jock Wallace and later John Greig. However, upon the former’s return in 1983, Wallace decided to make changes to the coaching team, bringing in Alex Totten as first team coach and allowed Tommy McLean, David Provan and Mason to leave.

He died in September 2019 at the age of 79.

References

External links
 

1940 births
2019 deaths
Footballers from Kilmarnock
Scottish footballers
Association football midfielders
Rangers F.C. players
Kilmarnock F.C. players
Greenock Morton F.C. players
Scottish Football League players
Rangers F.C. non-playing staff
Scottish Junior Football Association players
Lugar Boswell Thistle F.C. players